Kingsley Davis (August 20, 1908 – February 27, 1997) was an internationally recognized American sociologist and demographer.  He was identified by the American Philosophical Society as one of the most outstanding social scientists of the twentieth century, and was a Hoover Institution senior research fellow.

Education and career
Davis received his Ph.D. from Harvard University and taught at Smith College, Clark University, Pennsylvania State University, Princeton University, Columbia University, the University of California at Berkeley and the University of Southern California.

Among his other accomplishments, Davis
 served as president of the Population Association of America and the American Sociological Association
 represented the United States on the United Nations Population Commission
 member of the Advisory Council of the National Aeronautics and Space Administration and the Advisory Committee on Population for the U.S. Bureau of the Census
 was an elected member of both the American Philosophical Society (1960) and the American Academy of Arts and Sciences (1964).
 was the first sociologist in the United States to be elected to the National Academy of Sciences (1966).

Davis won the Irene B. Taeuber Award for outstanding research in demography (1978), the Common Wealth Award for distinguished work in sociology (1979), and the Career of Distinguished Scholarship Award from the American Sociological Association (1982).
In 1953 he was elected as a Fellow of the American Statistical Association.

Research
Davis led and conducted major studies of societies in Europe, South America, Africa and Asia, coined the term "population explosion", and played a major role in the naming and development of the  demographic transition model. He was also one of the original scholars in the development of the theory of overurbanization. He is also credited with coining the term "zero population growth"  although  George Stolnitz claimed to have that distinction.

Davis had several children  while espousing limitations on childbearing worldwide. Davis also published an influential article with Wilbert E. Moore entitled "Some Principles of Stratification," which was a very influential functionalist account of the reasons for social inequality. Davis and Moore synthesize Durkheim and Parsons to argue for the "functional necessity" of some positions over others: those that are highest paid go to the most deserving individuals; at the same time, the differential rewards motivates individuals to work to fill positions they might otherwise not. Thus, from this perspective, illness is a deviant state because it means that the individual may not be able to fill their role. Sociologists see this article as a paradigmatic case of functionalist logic, and indeed, Davis came to be a leading figure in this school of sociology.

As a demographer, Davis was internationally recognized for his expertise in world population growth and resources, the history and theory of international migration, world urbanization, demographic transition and population policy.

Published works
Kingsley Davis was a prolific scholar who published numerous research articles, book chapters and books.

Books

Chapters

Edited volumes

Other writing
In the popular press, Davis' work appeared in "Scientific American," "Science," the "New York Times Magazine," "Commentary," "Foreign Affairs" and numerous newspapers.

In 1957, Davis predicted that population of the world would reach six billion by the year 2000. He was remarkably close; that population figure was reached in October 1999.

References

Further reading
David Heer and Kingsley Davis. "Kingsley Davis: A Biography and Selections from His Works" (Transaction Publishers, 2005)

External links
Kingsley Davis at Encyclopædia Britannica
Obituary at Stanford News
Biography at the American Sociological Association
Biography from Proceedings of the American Philosophical Society

1908 births
1997 deaths
American sociologists
American demographers
Presidents of the American Sociological Association
Members of the United States National Academy of Sciences
Harvard University alumni
University of Texas alumni
Fellows of the American Statistical Association
Members of the American Philosophical Society